The 2017 Gerry Weber Open was a tennis tournament played on outdoor grass courts. It was the 25th edition of the event and part of the ATP World Tour 500 series of the 2017 ATP World Tour. It took place at the Gerry Weber Stadion in Halle, Germany, between 19 and 25 June 2017.

Points and prize money

Point distribution

Prize money 

*per team

Singles main-draw entrants

Seeds 

 1 Rankings are as of June 12, 2017

Other entrants 
The following players received wildcards into the singles main draw:
  Dustin Brown
  Tommy Haas
  Andrey Rublev

The following players received entry from the qualifying draw:
  Lukáš Lacko
  Maximilian Marterer
  Vasek Pospisil
  Mikhail Youzhny

The following player received entry as a lucky loser:
  Yūichi Sugita

Withdrawals
Before the tournament
  Pablo Carreño Busta →replaced by  Benoît Paire
  Lu Yen-hsun →replaced by  Yūichi Sugita

Retirements
  Kei Nishikori

Doubles main-draw entrants

Seeds 

 Rankings are as of June 12, 2017.

Other entrants
The following pairs received wildcards into the doubles main draw:
  Dustin Brown /  Jan-Lennard Struff 
  Florian Mayer /  Philipp Petzschner

The following pair received entry from the qualifying draw:
  Andre Begemann /  Tim Pütz

Retirements
  Brian Baker

Champions

Singles 

  Roger Federer def.  Alexander Zverev, 6–1, 6–3

Doubles 

  Łukasz Kubot /  Marcelo Melo def.  Alexander Zverev /  Mischa Zverev, 5–7, 6–3, [10–8]

External links 
 Official website